Group 2 is a rugby league competition on the north coast of New South Wales Since 1966, run under the auspices of the Country Rugby League. The Group 2 area runs from Grafton in the north to Macksville in the south. Group 2 teams played for many decades before 1966 when some redistribution, amalgamation or control mechanism presumably changed. Teams on the Nambucca River, namely Bowraville, Macksville and Nambucca Heads played in a southern division against Kempsey, Smithtown, Port Macquarie and Wauchope before 1966.

Teams

Clubs in 2022 Group 2 Competitions

*Kempsey Dragons no longer field a senior team, but remain a member of Group 2. Kempsey's modern senior side, the Macleay Valley Mustangs, play in the Group 3 Rugby League Premiership.

‡Smithtown's senior team is Lower Macleay Magpies, in Hastings League.

Former Clubs

First Grade Grand Final Results 1966 – present

Leader Board

Players from Group 2 to play NRL

Notable players

Bellingen 
Dylan Edwards

Coffs Harbour Comets

Grafton Ghosts 
Danny Wicks
Anthony Don

Macksville Sea Eagles 
Matt Donovan
Paul Davis
Nathan Smith

Orara Valley Axemen 
Luke Metcalf

Sawtell Panthers 
Kevin Gordon
Jarrod Wallace
Mitchell Thomson
Troy Robinson
Clint Greenshields
Noel Cleal
Jason Alchin

South Grafton Rebels 
Brian Graham
John Ferguson
Ron Gill
Fred Felsch
Paul Pyers
Kevin Stevens
Eric Lawrence

Woolgoolga Seahorses

Bowraville Tigers 
Greg Inglis

Kempsey Dragons 
Amos Roberts

Nambucca Heads Roosters 
Ryan Stig
Daniel Fitzhenry

Smithtown Tigers 
Albert Kelly
Aiden Tolman

See also

Rugby League Competitions in Australia

Sources

 Group 2 on Country Rugby League's official site

References

Rugby league competitions in New South Wales